The Monastir Preparatory Engineering Institute or IPEIM, is a Tunisian university establishment created according to the law N° 95–40 in 1992. Part of the University of Monastir

Departments  
The Monastir Preparatory Engineering Institute has three independent departments :
 Mathematics and Physics (MP)
 Physics and Chemistry (PC)
 Technology (PT)

See also

Preparatory Institute 
 Tunis Preparatory Engineering Institute
 Preparatory Institute for Engineering Studies of Nabeul
 El Manar Preparatory Engineering Institute
 Sfax Preparatory Engineering Institute

Other 
 National Engineering School of Monastir
 University of Monastir
 Faculty of sciences of Monastir

References

External links 
 

Universities in Tunisia
1992 establishments in Tunisia